Stensson is a surname. Notable people with the surname include:

Annette Stensson-Fjordefalk (born 1958), Swedish actress
Katarina Stensson (born 1988), Swedish politician
Nils Stensson Sture (1512–1527 or 1528), Swedish historical figure
Svante Stensson Sture (1517–1567), Swedish count and statesman

Surnames of Swedish origin